Yeshayau Sheinfeld (Scheinfeld) (1909–1979) was an Israeli painter and industrialist.

Early life and work
Sheinfeld was born in Bessarabia and in 1929 he emigrated to Mandate Palestine. He first resided in Magdiel, then in 1941 relocated to Petach Tikva where he found employment as a stonecutter and a road worker. In 1947, he established his own stonecutting factory which in time became one of the biggest quarries in Israel, producing thousands of tons of materials daily for the Israeli construction and road industry.

Painting career
It was only in 1969 at age 60, that Scheinfeld first took up a paintbrush. In his first year, unwilling to reveal the need for self-expression, Scheinfeld worked surreptitiously in the early mornings or late nights - when no one was about.

Just a year later, in 1970, after a successful group exhibition in the Tel Aviv Museum of Art, Scheinfeld was recognized as one of the striking artists on the local Naïve art scene. Although his usual subject matter was the scenery of the land of Israel, Scheinfeld introduced the landscape using a mosaic pattern, something that had become his unique artistic signature. While Scheinfeld's favorite media were tempera and ink on board, he also worked in various others including acrylic on canvas and board, etching with hand-painted colors, mixed-media collage and even weaving.

Between 1971 and 1975, Scheinfeld gained a wide international recognition and his artworks were exhibited not only in Israel, but also in Europe and in North and South America. In 1975, Scheinfeld's colorful pen-and-ink artwork ‘Aqueduct’ was featured in UNICEF’s New Year Round collection.

Although Scheinfeld had only a short ten-year career as an artist, in 2004 he was recognized by INSITA, the International Triennial congress of Naïve self-taught Art, as one of the four exceptional artists who played a major role in the international context of 20th century art.

Collections
 Petach-Tikva Museum of Art, Petach-Tikva, Israel
 The President's Residence, Jerusalem, Israel	
 Stadshof Nijmegen, The Netherlands		
 Slovak National Gallery, Bratislava, Slovakia
 Musee d’Art spontane, Bruxelles, Belgium
 Musea Oost-Vlaanderen in Evolutie (MovE) Gent, Belgium
 Museum of La Creation Franche	Begles, France
 The Magnes Collection of Jewish art and life, Berkeley University of California, United States
 Gallery of International Naive Art (GINA), Tel Aviv, Israel

Exhibitions

1970
 Yad-Lebanim Museum, Petach Tikva, Israel
 Tel-Aviv Museum of Art, Tel-Aviv, Israel

1971
 Municipal Museum, Holon, Israel
 Israel-America Cultural Foundation, New York, USA
 The Union of American Hebrew Congregations, New York, USA
 Gallery La Boetle, New York, USA
 The Naive Art Gallery, New York, USA
 The Great Neck Library, New York, USA
 Traklin Gallery, Haifa, Israel
 Ben Yehuda Gallery, Tel Aviv, Israel

1972
 The Naïve Art Gallery, São Paulo, Brazil 
 The Magnes Collection of Jewish art and life, Berkeley USA

1973
 Queens County Art & Cultural Center, New York, USA
 Ile Mostra Internazionale dei Naifs Contemporanei, Lugano, Switzerland
 Great Neck Library, New York, USA
 Weizmann Institute of Science, Rechovot, Israel
 Yad-Lebanim Museum, Petach Tikva, Israel

1974
 Gumprecht Gallery, Hamburg, Germany
 Regard Gallery, Lyon, France
 Ben Uri Museum, London, UK

1975
 UNICEF's Year Round collection, The United Nations NY, USA
 Runhof Gallery, Düsseldorf, Germany
 France TV art expo (French public national TV), Paris, France
 Sara Bar Gallery, Los Angeles, USA

1976
 Yad-Lebanim Museum, Petach Tikva, Israel

1977
 Canada-Israel Cultural Foundation, Montreal, Canada
 The Museum of Modern Art, Haifa, Israel

1978
 Delson Richter Gallery, Tel Aviv, Israel

1980
 Petach Tikva Museum of Art, "In memory of J. Scheinfeld", Petach Tikva, Israel

1984
 Rein C G Galleries, Minneapolis, USA
 The Museum of Modern Art, Haifa, Israel

1987
 Galerie de Oogappel, Haarlem, the Netherlands
 Galerie Hamer, Amsterdam, the Netherlands

1990
 Galerie Hamer, Amsterdam, the Netherlands

2000
 Galerie Hamer, Amsterdam, the Netherlands

2004
 Galerie Hamer, "Yeshayahu Scheinfeld", Amsterdam, the Netherlands
 Galerie Hamer, "Naieven Outsiders", Amsterdam, the Netherlands
 Slovak National Gallery, INSITA 2004, Bratislava, Slovakia

2007
 Petach Tikva Museum of Art, "Petting Corner", Petach Tikva, Israel
 Monart Art Museum, Ashdod, Israel
 Slovak National Gallery, INSITA 2007, Bratislava, Slovakia

2008
 Petach Tikva Museum of Art, "Etchings, Scratches and Scars- Changing Representations of the Israeli Soldier", Petach Tikva, Israel
 , "Magic Arquitecture", Münster, Germany

2012
 , "Visions Orientales Exposition d'Adib Fattal et Yeshayahu Scheinfeld", Brussels, Belgium

2014
 Petach Tikva Museum of Art, "Sea, Sail & a Boat", Petach Tikva, Israel
 Petach Tikva Museum of Art, "Fracture", Petach Tikva, Israel

2015
 Petach Tikva Museum of Art, "Urban Legend", Petach Tikva, Israel

External links

References

1909 births
1979 deaths
Romanian emigrants to Mandatory Palestine
Israeli painters
Naïve art